James Henry Ashton (1819 – 17 January 1889) was a circus proprietor in Australia. He founded Ashton's Circus which is still operated by his descendants.

He travelled the Australian colonies for at least 40 years.

On 17 January 1889, while on tour, he died at the Metropolitan Hotel in Gladstone, Queensland and was buried in Gladstone cemetery.

The circus has been passed down from generation to generation and, as at April 2020, the 7th generations of the Ashton family are still performing circus and cabaret shows.

References

Further reading 

 

1889 deaths
Circus owners
Australian entertainment industry businesspeople
19th-century Australian businesspeople
1819 births